Ellingboe is a surname. Notable people with the surname include:

 Bradley Ellingboe (born 1958), American composer
 Jules Ellingboe (1892–1948), American racecar driver